Luke Patrick O'Halloran (born 1991 in Thousand Oaks, California) is a painter living and working in Brooklyn, New York. He is known for his paintings and drawings of forever spinning wheels, detailed portraits of slot machines in motion.

Career 
O'Halloran grew up in California and lived in Colorado for seven years before moving to New York. O'Halloran typically paints and draws various subjects in motion including slot machines and casino games, bowling balls, fruits falling from baskets, and free falling cats. Of the cats, the O'Halloran notes that felines have both a nonlethal terminal velocity and a righting reflex, adaptations he hopes humans can strive for one day.  Influences include early Jasper Johns's number paintings and Vija Celmins.

References

American artists
1991 births
Living people